The 2003 FIA Sportscar Championship Donington was the fifth race for the 2003 FIA Sportscar Championship season held at Donington Park and ran for two hours and thirty minutes.  It took place on August 10, 2003.

Official results
Class winners in bold.  Cars failing to complete 75% of winner's distance marked as Not Classified (NC).

† - #8 was disqualified for being pushed back onto the track by a marshall.

Statistics
 Pole Position - #5 RN Motorsport - 1:24.632
 Fastest Lap - #5 RN Motorsport - 1:27.194
 Distance - 390.266 km
 Average Speed - 155.479 km/h

References 

D
FIA Sportscar
6 Hours of Donington